The 349th Operations Group (349 OG) is a United States Air Force Reserve unit assigned to the 349th Air Mobility Wing. The unit is stationed at Travis Air Force Base, California.

The 349 OG controls all operational flying squadrons of the 349 AW.

The unit's World War II predecessor unit, the 349th Troop Carrier Group was a C-46 Commando transport unit assigned to Ninth Air Force in Western Europe.

Units
 70th Air Refueling Squadron (KC-10 Extender)
 79th Air Refueling Squadron (KC-10 Extender)
 349th Aeromedical Evacuation Squadron
 301st Airlift Squadron (C-17 Globemaster III)
 312th Airlift Squadron (C-5 Galaxy)
 349th Operations Support Flight
 349th Air Mobility Operations Flight

History
 See the 349th Air Mobility Wing for additional history and lineage

World War II
Trained at various bases for troop carrier operations, participating in maneuvers and practicing paratroop drops, glider towing, and flying training, until moving to Europe in March 1945. In western Europe, transported vehicles, gasoline, and supplies. At the end of the war, evacuated patients and allied former prisoners of war. Returned to America in July and August 1945.

Air Force Reserve
In 1946, trained Chinese crews to operate C-46 aircraft. Between June 1949 and April 1951, trained reservists in troop carrier operations. Between June 1952 and September 1957, trained for fighter-bomber operations, but returned to troop carrier training from September 1957 to April 1959.

Activated in 1992 to manage strategic airlift squadrons, and in 1994 also acquired air refueling squadrons. Since then the group has taken part in joint training exercises, channel and special assignment airlift missions, and humanitarian and contingency operations worldwide.

Lineage
 Established as the 349th Troop Carrier Group on 23 October 1943
 Activated on 1 November 1943
 Inactivated on 7 September 1946
 Redesignated 349th Troop Carrier Group, Medium on 10 May 1949
 Activated in the reserve on 27 June 1949
 Ordered to active service on 1 April 1951
 Inactivated on 2 April 1951
 Redesignated 349th Fighter-Bomber Group on 26 May 1952
 Activated in the reserve on 13 June 1952
 Redesignated 349th Troop Carrier Group, Medium on 1 September 1957
 Inactivated on 14 April 1959
 Redesignated: 349th Military Airlift Group on 31 July 1985 (Remained inactive)
 Redesignated: 349th Operations Group on 1 August 1992
 Activated in the Reserve on 1 August 1992

Assignments
 61st Troop Carrier Wing, 1 November 1943
 60th Troop Carrier Wing, 11 March 1944
 I Troop Carrier Command, November 1944
 IX Troop Carrier Command, April 1945
 52d Troop Carrier Wing, 30 April 1945
 50th Troop Carrier Wing, 20 May 1945
 52d Troop Carrier Wing, 31 January 1946
 Third Air Force, 27 August – 7 September 1946
 349th Troop Carrier Wing, 27 June 1949 – 2 April 1951
 349th Fighter-Bomber Wing (later 349 Troop Carrier Wing), 13 June 1952 – 14 April 1959
 349th Airlift Wing (later 349 Air Mobility Wing), 1 August 1992 – present

Components
 70th Air Refueling Squadron: 1 September 1994 – present
 79th Air Refueling Squadron: 1 April 1995 – present
 23d Troop Carrier Squadron: 1 December 1944 – 7 September 1946
 97th Troop Carrier Squadron : 25 March 1958 – 14 April 1959
 301st Airlift Squadron: 1 August 1992 – present
 311th Troop Carrier Squadron: 1 November 1943 – 1 December 1944; 27 June 1949 – 2 April 1951
 312th Troop Carrier Squadron (later 312th Fighter-Bomber Squadron, 312th Troop Carrier Squadron, 312th Airlift Squadron): 1 November 1943 – 7 September 1946; 27 June 1949 – 2 April 1951; 13 June 1952 – 14 April 1959; 1 August 1992 – present
 313th Troop Carrier Squadron: 1 November 1943 – 7 September 1946; 27 June 1949 – 2 April 1951; 13 June 1952 – 14 April 1959
 314th Troop Carrier Squadron: 1 November 1943 – 31 July 1946; 27 June 1949 – 2 April 1951; 13 June 1952 – 14 April 1959
 328th Troop Carrier Squadron: 16 November 1957 – 25 March 1958
 708th Airlift Squadron: 1 August 1992 – 30 September 1996
 710th Airlift Squadron: 1 August 1992 – 1 January 1998

Stations

 Sedalia Army Air Field, Missouri, 1 November 1943
 Alliance Army Air Field, Nebraska, 20 January 1944
 Pope Field, North Carolina, 11 March 1944
 Baer Field, Indiana, 4 – 15 March 1945
 RAF Barkston Heath (AAF-483), England, 3 April 1945

 Roye-Amy Airfield (A-73), France, April-13 July 1945
 Bergstrom Field, Texas, September 1945 – 7 September 1946
 Hamilton Air Force Base, California, 27 June 1949 – 2 April 1951
 Hamilton Air Force Base, California, 13 June 1952 – 14 April 1959
 Travis Air Force Base, California, 1 August 1992 – present

Aircraft

 C-53 Skytrooper, 1943–1944
 C-47 Skytrain, 1943–1946; 1955–1956
 C-46 Commando, 1944–1946; 1949–1951; 1952–1958
 CG-4 Waco (Glider), 1944–1946
 Waco CG-13 (Glider), 1944–1945
 B-17 Flying Fortress, 1944
 B-24 Liberator, 1944
 C-109 Liberator Express, 1945

 F-51 Mustang, 1953–1954
 F-80 Shooting Star, 1953–1956
 C-45 Expeditor, 1954–1956
 F-84 Thunderjet, 1956–1957
 C-119 Flying Boxcar, 1958–1959
 C-141 Starlifter, 1992–1998
 C-5 Galaxy, 1992–present
 KC-10 Extender, 1994–present

References

 Notes

 Citations

Bibliography

External links

Operations groups of the United States Air Force
Military units and formations established in 1943